Barry Denny may refer to:
 Barry Denny (footballer), Australian rules footballer
 Sir Barry Denny, 1st Baronet (c. 1744–1794), Anglo-Irish politician
 Sir Barry Denny, 2nd Baronet (died 1794), Anglo-Irish politician
 Barry Denny (Tralee MP), Irish politician

See also
Denny Barry (1883–1923), Irish Republican who died during a hunger strike
Denny (surname)